The Pakistan Education Board women's cricket team is a Pakistani women's cricket team, sponsored by the Pakistan Education Board. They competed in the National Women's Cricket Championship between 2009–10 and 2012–13.

History
Pakistan Education Board competed in the National Women's Cricket Championship between 2009–10 and 2012–13. In the 2011–12 and 2012–13 seasons, they finished second in their group, winning three matches in the former season and two matches in the latter.

Players

Notable players
Players who played for Pakistan Education Board and played internationally are listed below, in order of first international appearance (given in brackets):

 Anam Amin (2014)
 Sidra Nawaz (2014)
 Ghulam Fatima (2017)
 Natalia Pervaiz (2017)
 Fareeha Mehmood (2018)
 Kaynat Hafeez (2019)

Seasons

National Women's Cricket Championship

References

Women's cricket teams in Pakistan